Gushan (Mandarin: 古鄯镇) is a town in Minhe Hui and Tu Autonomous County, Haidong, Qinghai, China. In 2010, Gushan had a total population of 21,856: 11,523 males and 10,333 females: 4,729 aged under 14, 15,823 aged between 15 and 65 and 1,304 aged over 65.

References 
 

Township-level divisions of Qinghai
Haidong